Oleg Yakovlev may refer to:

 Oleg Yakovlev (footballer, born 1970), Russian football player
 Oleg Yakovlev (footballer, born 1997), Russian football player
 Oleg Yakovlev (singer) (1969—2017), Russian singer, former member of group Ivanushki International

See also
 Yakovlev (surname)